Anar Salmanov (born 4 October 1980) is an Azerbaijani football referee.

Biography
Salmanov teaches at the Azerbaijan Sport and Health University. He refereed in Azerbaijan Premier League since 2003. He is a UEFA category 2 referee.

UEFA Euro 2012 Qualifying

References

External links
 
 
 
 Anar Salmanov referee profile at Eu-football.info
 Anar Salmanov referee profile at Playmaker
 
 
 

1980 births
Living people
Azerbaijani football referees
Sportspeople from Baku